Human Heredity is a peer-reviewed scientific journal covering all aspects of human genetics. It was established in 1948 as Acta Genetica et Statistica Medica, obtaining its current name in 1969. It is published eight times per year by Karger Publishers and the editor-in-chief is Pak Sham (University of Hong Kong). According to the Journal Citation Reports, the journal has a 2017 impact factor of 0.542.

References

External links

Karger academic journals
Publications established in 1948
Genetics journals
English-language journals
Behavioural genetics journals
8 times per year journals